Johnson Omuhunde Rwashote Byabashaija (Born on 27 September 1957) also known as Canon. Dr. J.O.R Byabashaija is a Ugandan Canon and Veterinary doctor who is the Commissioner General of Prisons in Uganda since 2005. Byabashaija was appointed a Lay Canon in the Church of Uganda North Kigezi.

Education And Background 
Byabashaija was born in Kajumiro village Nyakishenyi sub-county, Rubabo county,  Rukungiri District to the late Gregory Rwanshote (father) and  Late Cecilia Rwanshote(mother). Byabasheija is the first born of seven children in family of three boys and four girls.

He started his education from Nyakishenyi Primary School, Kamwezi Primary School and Mukyayi Primary School for his primary education before joining Mutorere Secondary School in Kisoro district for O-level education and this was where he met the former Inspector General of Police Gen Kale Kayihura. Byabashaija then joined Makerere College School for his  A-Level education.  He offered Physics, Chemistry, Biology and Subsidiary Mathematics and then was admitted to Makerere University Veterinary School for a four year course in Veterinary medicine. In 1986, he went for a Post-graduate Master of Science at the University of Glasgow United Kingdom.

Career 
After university, Byabashaija taught Physics, Chemistry and Mathematics at Lakeside Secondary School in Luzira.

In 1982, Byabashaija joined Uganda Prisons Service and underwent a Cadet Assistant Superintendent of Prisons Course at the Prisons Training School then he joined the Uganda Prisons Service. He was first posted to Kigo Prison to run the prisons hatchery, for about 15 years and eventually became Officer-in-Charge of Kigo Prison. In 1999, he was promoted to Assistant Commissioner of Prisons and in 2000 was transferred to Prisons Headquarters as Assistant Commissioner in charge of farms inspectorate. He was later promoted to a Senior Assistant Commissioner for two years and then promoted to Deputy Commissioner General for One and half years after which he became the Commissioner General of Prisons replacing Joseph A.A. Etima who retired in 2005.

In 2020, the Parliament Appointments Committee rejected the re-appointment of Byabashaija as the Commissioner-General and James Mwanje, as his deputy of the Uganda Prisons Service on the basis of old age. But in January 2022, President Yoweri Museveni reappointed Byabashaija as the Commissioner-General of the Uganda Prisons Service after sometime of undisclosed discussions. In the same year, the Forum for Democratic Change (FDC) protested against the re-appointment of Johnson Byabashaija as the Commissioner General of Prisons.

Byabashaija is also a poultry breeder carried out mainly on his farm called Jena Farms in Kigo, Entebbe.

Personal life 
From the year 1988, Byabashaija has been married to Byabashaija Janipher.

Awards 
In 2017, Johnson Byabashaija was awarded with the JLOS Distinguished Service Award at the Recognition awards 2017 during the 22nd Joint Government of Uganda and Development Partners JLOS Annual Review conference at Speke Resort Munyonyo.

See also 

 Kale Kayihura
 Law enforcement in Uganda

References

External links 
 Uganda Prisons Service

1957 births
Living people
Law enforcement in Uganda
Makerere University alumni
University of Glasgow
People from Rukungiri District
20th-century Ugandan people
Ugandan religious leaders